General Sir Thomas Willshire, 1st Baronet,  (24 August 1789 – 31 May 1862) was a British Army officer.

He was born in Halifax, Nova Scotia, the eldest surviving son of Captain John Willshire by Mary, daughter of William Linden of Dublin. His father, a soldier himself, purchased Thomas' Army commission in the 38th Foot when he was only 6 years old. He joined the regiment in the West Indies in 1798, returned with it to England and attended schools in King's Lynn and Kensington. He was promoted captain in 1804, joined the regiment in South America and took part in the attack on Buenos Aires. He then went with the regiment to Portugal in 1808, where he fought at Roliça, Vimiero, and Coruña. In 1809 he served in the Walcheren Campaign, where his father died.

In June 1812 the first battalion of the 38th embarked for the Iberian Peninsula, with Willshire commanding the light company. It joined the Royal Regiment and the 9th Foot in the 5th (Leith's) division three days before the Battle of Salamanca, where Willshire was twice wounded. He commanded the light companies of the brigade in the action on the Carrion on 25 October during the retreat from Burgos. In 1813 the division formed part of Graham's corps at the Vittoria and the Siege of San Sebastian. There the 38th was assigned the lesser breach in the first assault and was held in reserve in the second assault, although soon brought up in support of the stormers. He commanded the light companies of the brigade at the passage of the Bidasoa, the Battle of the Nive (9–11 December) and the repulse of the sortie from Bayonne (14 April 1814). He received a brevet lieutenant-colonelcy, and afterwards the Peninsular silver medal with seven clasps.

In 1815 his battalion was sent to the Netherlands, but was too late for the Battle of Waterloo and instead went on to Paris, where Willshire was employed for a short time on the staff. In December he returned with the battalion to England and in June 1818 went with it to the Cape. On his way out he wrote a manual of 'light company manœuvres in concert with battalion manœuvres' which was sent to Sir Henry Torrens and was probably used by him in preparing the drill-book of 1824.

Early in 1819 Willshire was sent to the frontier as commandant of British Kaffraria. A quarrel between the chiefs, in which the British authorities intervened, led to a well-planned attack on Grahamstown by Mokana with six thousand Kaffirs on 22 April. The attack was repulsed by a company of the 38th and 240 local troops and Mokana forced to surrender, after which the territory between the Great Fish River and the Keiskamma River was added to the colony and Fort Willshire built upon it.

In 1822 the 38th were sent to Calcutta and in 1823 Willshire was given a majority without purchase in the 46th Foot, which he commanded for some time at Bellary. In December 1824 he commanded a brigade in the force under Colonel Deacon which retook the fort at Kittoor. On 30 August 1827 he was made lieutenant colonel without purchase of the 2nd (Queen's), stationed at Poona, serving with that regiment for nearly ten years.

On 10 January 1837, he was made brevet colonel, with the local rank of brigadier general in India. In 1838, while commanding a brigade at Poona, he was given one in the 'Army of the Indus,' formed for the invasion of Afghanistan. In February 1839 the army was reorganised and Willshire was given the command of the Bombay division of infantry. His troops were the last to cross the Bolan, reaching Quetta on 30 April, and Kandahar on 4 May. He took part in the storming of Ghazni on 23 July and went on to Kabul. On the return journey, after having been presented with the Order of the Dooranee Empire, he was told to depose Mehrab Khan of Kelat, which he achieved by storming his fort, in the process of which Mehrab Khan was killed. He was made a Knight Commander of the Order of the Bath in 1839 and created a baronet (Willshire of the East Indies) for the capture of Kelat.

He returned to England in 1840, retired from the Queen's regiment on half-pay, and was appointed commandant at Chatham. He remained there till 1846 when he was promoted major general. He was made colonel of the 51st Foot on 26 June 1849, promoted lieutenant general on 20 June 1854 and general on 20 April 1861. He was advanced to Knight Grand Cross of the Order of the Bath on 28 June 1861.

He died on 31 May 1862 at Hill House, near Windsor. He had married Annette Lætitia, eldest daughter of Captain Berkeley Maxwell, R.A., of Tuppendene, Kent and had two sons and three daughters.

References

1789 births
1862 deaths
People from Halifax, Nova Scotia
19th-century British people
British Army generals
Knights Grand Cross of the Order of the Bath
Baronets in the Baronetage of the United Kingdom
South Staffordshire Regiment officers
46th Regiment of Foot officers
Queen's Royal Regiment officers
King's Own Yorkshire Light Infantry officers
British military personnel of the First Anglo-Afghan War
British Army personnel of the Napoleonic Wars
Canadian military personnel from Nova Scotia